An incontinence pad is a small, impermeable multi-layered sheet with high absorbency that is used in the incontinence and health-care industries as a precaution against fecal or urinary incontinence. It is generally made of cotton if washable, or paper if disposable. Incontinence diapers (or incontinence nappies) are a common incontinence pad. Incontinence pads are usually placed in an undergarment or on a bed or chair under a person. Incontinence pads are manufactured in light and heavy grades which offer a range of absorbencies, often referred to as a 'working capacity', which refers to the true absorbency an incontinence pad offers when in use. These sorts of pads can come as panty-liners, inserts, pads or even available as replacement underwear.

In the UK, chair or bed-based protective pads, known as chair pads or bed pads, are commonly used in healthcare settings where incontinence may be an issue. They are usually constructed in layers of quilted absorbent fabric and alternating liquid impermeable plastic or polyurethane. Products containing polyurethane are generally considered better as they provide a waterproof backing, whilst still allowing air to circulate reducing the risk of rashes and sores.

Healthcare 
Incontinence pads are often overused in people with dementia. Guidelines suggest that treatment should always be preferred to containment as pads can be uncomfortable and negatively affect the person's dignity. A balanced diet, exercise, hand hygiene, and prompts to go to the toilet should be preferred over using pads. An ethnographic study in the UK pointed out the existence of "pad culture" which means that the main care strategy was the use of continence pads even in cases where people were continent. The main reasons for this strategy were fears about safety and falls which kept people in their beds and did not support independence. This mode of caring often leads to undignified situations and the use of demeaning language.

See also
Adult diaper
Rothwell scale

References

External links
incontinence pads: A Complete Guide
Independent continence product advisor

Urinary incontinence
Incontinence